Krysta Marie Svore (born 1979) is an American computer scientist specializing in quantum computing. She leads the Azure Quantum software team (formerly the Quantum Architectures and Computation group at Microsoft Research) for Microsoft in Redmond, Washington, where she is Distinguished Scientist and Vice President of Quantum Software. Beyond quantum computing, she has also worked on research in machine learning.

Education and career
Svore is originally from the Seattle, Washington area. She majored in mathematics at Princeton University, and became intrigued by the possibilities of quantum computing through a junior-year seminar on cryptography given by Andrew Wiles, in which she learned of the ability of quantum computers using Shor's algorithm to break the RSA cryptosystem.

She completed her Ph.D. in 2006 at Columbia University, with highest distinction, under the joint supervision of Alfred Aho and Joseph F. Traub. Her dissertation was Software Tools and Failure Thresholds for Reliable, Scalable, Fault-tolerant Quantum Computation.

She joined Microsoft Research in 2006, initially working on problems in machine learning but later focusing more heavily on her work with quantum computing.

Recognition
Svore was named to the 2021 class of Fellows of the American Association for the Advancement of Science..  She was named one of the 39 Most Powerful female engineers by Business Insider in 2018.

References

External links

1979 births
Living people
American computer scientists
American women computer scientists
Princeton University alumni
Columbia University alumni
Microsoft Research people
Fellows of the American Association for the Advancement of Science